The 2012–13 Grambling State Tigers men's basketball team represented Grambling State University during the 2012–13 NCAA Division I men's basketball season. The Tigers, led by first year head coach Joseph Price, played their home games at the Fredrick C. Hobdy Assembly Center and were members of the Southwestern Athletic Conference. They finished the season 0–28, 0–18 in SWAC play to finish in last place. They lost in the quarterfinals of the SWAC tournament to Alabama A&M to become the eighth Division I team in NCAA history to finish a season winless.

Roster

Schedule

|-
!colspan=9| Regular season

|-
!colspan=9| 2013 SWAC Basketball tournament

References

Grambling State Tigers men's basketball seasons
Grambling State
Grambling State Tigers men's basketball
Grambling State Tigers men's basketball